Campaign for Better Transport is the name of two public transport advocacy groups:

Campaign for Better Transport (New Zealand) 
Campaign for Better Transport (United Kingdom)